Brutus is an unincorporated community in Pittsylvania County, in the U.S. state of Virginia.

References

The community is located in the north east part of the county, about 9 miles north/north-east of Gretna. It is surrounded with farmland, timber and single family homes. It is approximately 900 feet above sea level.
Two prominent landmarks have been a point of reference in guiding people to the area.  Most locals reminisce about the Grayson Jacobs Store that was located at the intersection of Scott Jacobs Memorial Drive and Spring Road. The proprietor was a well-known county supervisor who offered general merchandise to the surrounding community.  It was a social hub for the rural farmers of the area. 
The store was also a polling place for elections in the county. In the 1940s until the polling place was moved, the precinct was monitored to judge the outcome of the county election results.  There was a saying in the county, “So goes Brutus, so goes Pittsylvania County”.
Jacob's store closed in the 1970s when the proprietor died. The property lies in ruins today, with much of the old store building falling in.
Across the intersection diagonally from the store is Spring Road Baptist Church. This church was established in 1852 and has been located on this site since the late 1800s. The present sanctuary structure dates to circa 1902. On the south east corner of the intersection is a memorial for Scott Jacobs, a teen who died in an auto accident about 2 miles north on Scott Jacobs Memorial Drive, which was renamed in his memory.

Unincorporated communities in Virginia
Unincorporated communities in Pittsylvania County, Virginia